Ira Nagrath (died 22 January 2005), billed as Ira Roshan, was a Bengali singer and composer, wife of music director Roshan Lal Nagrath, and mother of music director Rajesh Roshan and actor Rakesh Roshan.

Career 
As a young woman, Ira Moitra was a singer heard on All India Radio in Delhi. She had musical (off-screen) credits on several films, including Anokhi Raat (1968), Shakka (1981), Aap Mujhe Achche Lagne Lage (2002), and Prateeksha (2006). She sang a duet with Lata Mangeshkar for the film Anokhe Pyar (1948), and completed recording a film score left unfinished when her composer husband died suddenly.

Personal life 
In 1948, Ira Moitra married Punjabi music director Roshan Lal Nagrath as his second wife, and moved to Bombay. Their sons were Rajesh Roshan (born 1955) and Rakesh Roshan (born 1949). She was widowed when Roshan died suddenly from a heart attack in 1967; she died in 2005. Actor Hrithik Roshan is her grandson. Her granddaughter, Sunaina Roshan, published a family history titled To Dad With Love (2014), with many pictures and anecdotes about Moitra and Roshan's household. In 2008, the speech and hearing wing of Nanavati Hospital in Mumbai was named for Ira Roshan.

References

External links 

Year of birth missing
2005 deaths

People from Delhi
Indian women singers
Bengali singers